Sevgi  is a common feminine Turkish given name. In Turkish, "Sevgi" means "Love".

People

Given name
Emine Sevgi Özdamar (born 1946), Turkish-German actress and author
Sevgi Çağal (born 1957), Turkish painter and sculptor
Sevgi Çınar (born 1994), Turkish footballer
Sevgi Gönül (born 1938), a member of the Koç family
Sevgi Sabancı (born 1963), Turkish businesswoman
Sevgi Salmanlı (born 1993), Turkish women's footballer
Sevgi Yorulmaz (born 1982), Turkish para archer

See also
Şarkım Sevgi Üstüne, Turkish entry for the Eurovision Song Contest 1987

Surnames
Turkish-language surnames
Turkish feminine given names